Henrietta Township may refer to the following places in the United States:

 Henrietta Township, Michigan
 Henrietta Township, Hubbard County, Minnesota
 Henrietta Township, Lorain County, Ohio
 Henrietta Township, LaMoure County, North Dakota

See also
 Henrietta (disambiguation)

Township name disambiguation pages